Andrew Welker (born July 31, 1989) is an American soccer player who played for Harrisburg City Islanders in the USL Professional Division.

Career

College
Welker attended Cumberland Valley High School, was part of the Eastern Pennsylvania olympic development program, and played four years of college soccer at Seton Hall University. He appeared in 64 games in his career for the Pirates, totaling 15 goals and 36 points. He was a Third Team All-BIG EAST and All-District First Team selection as a junior in 2009.

Professional
After trialing with Major League Soccer's Philadelphia Union in the 2011 MLS preseason. Welker turned professional in 2011 when he signed with Harrisburg City Islanders of the USL Professional Division. He made his professional debut on May 7, 2011, as a substitute in a 1–1 tie with FC New York. Welker was named the USL PRO Player of the Week for Week 16 of the 2011 season after he had a hat trick to lead his side to a 5–1 victory against FC New York on July 20, 2011. Welker has also played games for the Philadelphia Union in the 2011 MLS Reserve Division.

References

External links
Harrisburg City Islanders bio
Seton Hall bio

1989 births
Living people
American soccer players
Seton Hall Pirates men's soccer players
Penn FC players
USL Championship players
People from Mechanicsburg, Pennsylvania
Association football forwards